Mixcoatlus browni (commonly known as Brown's montane pit viper, sometimes Mexican montane pitviper) is a species of pit viper found at high elevations in Guerrero, Mexico. This species was previously placed in the genus Agkistrodon, where it was considered to be a junior synonym of Cerrophidion barbouri. Molecular evidence has since demonstrated that M. browni is a distinct species and the genus name was subsequently changed.

The genus Mixcoatlus is derived from the Nahuatl word Mixcoatl or "cloud serpent", a deity of the Aztec and several other Mesoamerica civilizations. This name also refers to the geographic restriction of this clade to elevations above .

Description
Not much is known about this species. This species is diurnal and it is usually found basking or moving throughout the day. This species has been seen by researchers to have more of a prehensile tail than other species in this genus. There is currently no evidence to suggest that M. browni is arboreal, although it does climb low vegetation.

Geographic range
Mixcoatlus browni is constricted to the cloud forests of western Sierra Madre del Sur in Guerrero, Mexico.

References

Crotalinae
Reptiles described in 1938
Snakes of North America
Endemic reptiles of Mexico
Fauna of the Sierra Madre del Sur
Taxa named by Benjamin Shreve